In fluid dynamics, gravity waves are waves generated in a fluid medium or at the interface between two media when the force of gravity or buoyancy tries to restore equilibrium. An example of such an interface is that between the atmosphere and the ocean, which gives rise to wind waves.

A gravity wave results when fluid is displaced from a position of equilibrium. The restoration of the fluid to equilibrium will produce a movement of the fluid back and forth, called a wave orbit. Gravity waves on an air–sea interface of the ocean are called surface gravity waves (a type of surface wave), while gravity waves that are  the body of the water (such as between parts of different densities) are called internal waves. Wind-generated waves on the water surface are examples of gravity waves, as are tsunamis and ocean tides.

The period of wind-generated gravity waves on the free surface of the Earth's ponds, lakes, seas and oceans are predominantly between 0.3 and 30 seconds (corresponding to frequencies predominantly between 3 Hz and 30 mHz). Shorter waves are also affected by surface tension and are called gravity–capillary waves and (if hardly influenced by gravity) capillary waves. Alternatively, so-called infragravity waves, which are due to subharmonic nonlinear wave interaction with the wind waves, have periods longer than the accompanying wind-generated waves.

Atmosphere dynamics on Earth

In the Earth's atmosphere, gravity waves are a mechanism that produce the transfer of momentum from the troposphere to the stratosphere and mesosphere. Gravity waves are generated in the troposphere by frontal systems or by airflow over mountains. At first, waves propagate through the atmosphere without appreciable change in mean velocity. But as the waves reach more rarefied (thin) air at higher altitudes, their amplitude increases, and nonlinear effects cause the waves to break, transferring their momentum to the mean flow. This transfer of momentum is responsible for the forcing of the many large-scale dynamical features of the atmosphere. For example, this momentum transfer is partly responsible for the driving of the Quasi-Biennial Oscillation, and in the mesosphere, it is thought to be the major driving force of the Semi-Annual Oscillation. Thus, this process plays a key role in the dynamics of the middle atmosphere.

The effect of gravity waves in clouds can look like altostratus undulatus clouds, and are sometimes confused with them, but the formation mechanism is different.

Quantitative description

Deep water
The phase velocity  of a linear gravity wave with wavenumber  is given by the formula

where g is the acceleration due to gravity. When surface tension is important, this is modified to

where σ is the surface tension coefficient and ρ is the density.

The gravity wave represents a perturbation around a stationary state, in which there is no velocity. Thus, the perturbation introduced to the system is described by a velocity field of infinitesimally small amplitude,  Because the fluid is assumed incompressible, this velocity field has the streamfunction representation

where the subscripts indicate partial derivatives. In this derivation it suffices to work in two dimensions , where gravity points in the negative z-direction. Next, in an initially stationary incompressible fluid, there is no vorticity, and the fluid stays irrotational, hence  In the streamfunction representation,  Next, because of the translational invariance of the system in the x-direction, it is possible to make the ansatz

where k is a spatial wavenumber. Thus, the problem reduces to solving the equation

If no fluid is to leak out of the bottom, we must have the condition

The free-surface condition: At the free surface , the kinematic condition holds:

Linearizing, this is simply

where σ is the surface tension and κ is the curvature of the interface, which in a linear approximation is

Thus,

However, this condition refers to the total pressure (base+perturbed), thus

(As usual, The perturbed quantities can be linearized onto the surface z=0.) Using hydrostatic balance, in the form 

this becomes

The perturbed pressures are evaluated in terms of streamfunctions, using the horizontal momentum equation of the linearised Euler equations for the perturbations,

to yield 

Putting this last equation and the jump condition together,

Substituting the second interfacial condition  and using the normal-mode representation, this relation becomes 

Using the solution , this gives

Since  is the phase speed in terms of the angular frequency  and the wavenumber, the gravity wave angular frequency can be expressed as

The group velocity of a wave (that is, the speed at which a wave packet travels) is given by

and thus for a gravity wave,

The group velocity is one half the phase velocity. A wave in which the group and phase velocities differ is called dispersive.

Shallow water
Gravity waves traveling in shallow water (where the depth is much less than the wavelength), are nondispersive: the phase and group velocities are identical and independent of wavelength and frequency. When the water depth is h,

Generation of ocean waves by wind

Wind waves, as their name suggests, are generated by wind transferring energy from the atmosphere to the ocean's surface, and capillary-gravity waves play an essential role in this effect. There are two distinct mechanisms involved, called after their proponents, Phillips and Miles.

In the work of Phillips, the ocean surface is imagined to be initially flat (glassy), and a turbulent wind blows over the surface. When a flow is turbulent, one observes a randomly fluctuating velocity field superimposed on a mean flow (contrast with a laminar flow, in which the fluid motion is ordered and smooth). The fluctuating velocity field gives rise to fluctuating stresses (both tangential and normal) that act on the air-water interface. The normal stress, or fluctuating pressure acts as a forcing term (much like pushing a swing introduces a forcing term). If the frequency and wavenumber  of this forcing term match a mode of vibration of the capillary-gravity wave (as derived above), then there is a resonance, and the wave grows in amplitude. As with other resonance effects, the amplitude of this wave grows linearly with time.

The air-water interface is now endowed with a surface roughness due to the capillary-gravity waves, and a second phase of wave growth takes place. A wave established on the surface either spontaneously as described above, or in laboratory conditions, interacts with the turbulent mean flow in a manner described by Miles. This is the so-called critical-layer mechanism. A critical layer forms at a height where the wave speed c equals the mean turbulent flow U. As the flow is turbulent, its mean profile is logarithmic, and its second derivative is thus negative. This is precisely the condition for the mean flow to impart its energy to the interface through the critical layer. This supply of energy to the interface is destabilizing and causes the amplitude of the wave on the interface to grow in time. As in other examples of linear instability, the growth rate of the disturbance in this phase is exponential in time.

This Miles–Phillips Mechanism process can continue until an equilibrium is reached, or until the wind stops transferring energy to the waves (i.e., blowing them along) or when they run out of ocean distance, also known as fetch length.

See also

 Acoustic wave
 Asteroseismology
 Green's law
 Horizontal convective rolls
 Lee wave
 Lunitidal interval
 Mesosphere#Dynamic features
 Morning Glory cloud
 Orr–Sommerfeld equation
 Rayleigh–Taylor instability
 Rogue wave
 Skyquake

Notes

References
 Gill, A. E., "Gravity wave". Glossary of Meteorology. American Meteorological Society (15 December 2014).
 Crawford,  Frank S., Jr. (1968).  Waves (Berkeley Physics Course, Vol. 3), (McGraw-Hill, 1968)    Free online version

Further reading

External links